Jaynie Margaret Hudgell (née Parkhouse, born 17 April 1956) is a retired female freestyle swimmer from New Zealand, who competed for her native country at the 1972 Summer Olympics in Munich, West Germany. 
She claimed the gold medal at the 1974 British Commonwealth Games in Christchurch, New Zealand, in the women's 800 m freestyle and bronze medal in the 400 m freestyle.

Born in Cambridge, Hudgell grew up in Christchurch where she attended Villa Maria College.

Jaynie Parkhouse Drive, within Queen Elizabeth II Park, where she won her gold and bronze medals, was named after her. Parkhouse Reserve and Parkhouse Street in Rangiora are also named after her.

In 2021 she became president of Swimming New Zealand.

References

External links
 
 

1956 births
Living people
New Zealand female swimmers
New Zealand female freestyle swimmers
Olympic swimmers of New Zealand
Swimmers at the 1974 British Commonwealth Games
Swimmers at the 1972 Summer Olympics
Commonwealth Games gold medallists for New Zealand
Commonwealth Games bronze medallists for New Zealand
Sportspeople from Cambridge, New Zealand
Commonwealth Games medallists in swimming
20th-century New Zealand women
21st-century New Zealand women
Medallists at the 1974 British Commonwealth Games